The 2005–06 New York Islanders season was the 34th season in the franchise's history. The Islanders replaced head coach Steve Stirling, replacing him with Brad Shaw. On March 14, 2006, the Islanders trailed the Montreal Canadiens by five points for the eighth and final playoff spot in the Eastern Conference, but won only five of their final 18 games to finish 12th in the East. Their 12th place finish meant that, for the first time since the 2000–01 season, the team would not qualify for the playoffs.

Offseason
Forward Alexei Yashin was named team captain, replacing the departed Michael Peca.

Regular season

Final standings

Schedule and results

|- align="center" bgcolor="#FFBBBB"
|1||L||October 5, 2005||4–6 || align="left"| @ Buffalo Sabres (2005–06) ||0–1–0 || 
|- align="center" bgcolor="#CCFFCC"
|2||W||October 8, 2005||3–2 || align="left"|  Carolina Hurricanes (2005–06) ||1–1–0 || 
|- align="center" bgcolor="#FFBBBB"
|3||L||October 10, 2005||1–3 || align="left"|  Florida Panthers (2005–06) ||1–2–0 || 
|- align="center" bgcolor="#CCFFCC"
|4||W||October 13, 2005||5–3 || align="left"| @ Washington Capitals (2005–06) ||2–2–0 || 
|- align="center" bgcolor="#FFBBBB"
|5||L||October 15, 2005||1–5 || align="left"| @ Philadelphia Flyers (2005–06) ||2–3–0 || 
|- align="center" bgcolor="#CCFFCC"
|6||W||October 19, 2005||3–2 SO|| align="left"| @ New York Rangers (2005–06) ||3–3–0 || 
|- align="center" bgcolor="#CCFFCC"
|7||W||October 20, 2005||5–4 || align="left"|  New York Rangers (2005–06) ||4–3–0 || 
|- align="center" bgcolor="#FFBBBB"
|8||L||October 22, 2005||3–4 || align="left"| @ Montreal Canadiens (2005–06) ||4–4–0 || 
|- align="center" bgcolor="#CCFFCC"
|9||W||October 25, 2005||4–3 || align="left"|  Atlanta Thrashers (2005–06) ||5–4–0 || 
|- align="center" bgcolor="#FFBBBB"
|10||L||October 27, 2005||1–3 || align="left"| @ New York Rangers (2005–06) ||5–5–0 || 
|- align="center" bgcolor="#FFBBBB"
|11||L||October 29, 2005||4–6 || align="left"|  Buffalo Sabres (2005–06) ||5–6–0 || 
|-

|- align="center" bgcolor="#CCFFCC"
|12||W||November 1, 2005||4–3 OT|| align="left"|  Boston Bruins (2005–06) ||6–6–0 || 
|- align="center" bgcolor="#FFBBBB"
|13||L||November 3, 2005||1–5 || align="left"|  Pittsburgh Penguins (2005–06) ||6–7–0 || 
|- align="center" bgcolor="#FFBBBB"
|14||L||November 5, 2005||0–6 || align="left"| @ Ottawa Senators (2005–06) ||6–8–0 || 
|- align="center" bgcolor="#CCFFCC"
|15||W||November 8, 2005||4–1 || align="left"| @ New Jersey Devils (2005–06) ||7–8–0 || 
|- align="center" bgcolor="#FFBBBB"
|16||L||November 10, 2005||2–3 || align="left"| @ Philadelphia Flyers (2005–06) ||7–9–0 || 
|- align="center" bgcolor="#CCFFCC"
|17||W||November 12, 2005||5–2 || align="left"|  Boston Bruins (2005–06) ||8–9–0 || 
|- align="center" bgcolor="#CCFFCC"
|18||W||November 14, 2005||3–2 SO|| align="left"| @ Pittsburgh Penguins (2005–06) ||9–9–0 || 
|- align="center" bgcolor="#CCFFCC"
|19||W||November 16, 2005||7–3 || align="left"| @ Atlanta Thrashers (2005–06) ||10–9–0 || 
|- align="center" bgcolor="#FFBBBB"
|20||L||November 17, 2005||2–3 || align="left"| @ Tampa Bay Lightning (2005–06) ||10–10–0 || 
|- align="center" bgcolor="#CCFFCC"
|21||W||November 19, 2005||5–3 || align="left"| @ Florida Panthers (2005–06) ||11–10–0 || 
|- align="center"
|22||L||November 23, 2005||3–4 SO|| align="left"|  Buffalo Sabres (2005–06) ||11–10–1 || 
|- align="center" bgcolor="#FFBBBB"
|23||L||November 25, 2005||2–6 || align="left"|  Ottawa Senators (2005–06) ||11–11–1 || 
|- align="center" bgcolor="#CCFFCC"
|24||W||November 26, 2005||4–2 || align="left"| @ Philadelphia Flyers (2005–06) ||12–11–1 || 
|- align="center" bgcolor="#FFBBBB"
|25||L||November 29, 2005||3–4 || align="left"|  Philadelphia Flyers (2005–06) ||12–12–1 || 
|-

|- align="center" bgcolor="#CCFFCC"
|26||W||December 4, 2005||2–1 || align="left"| @ Detroit Red Wings (2005–06) ||13–12–1 || 
|- align="center" bgcolor="#CCFFCC"
|27||W||December 6, 2005||6–3 || align="left"| @ St. Louis Blues (2005–06) ||14–12–1 || 
|- align="center"
|28||L||December 8, 2005||3–4 SO|| align="left"| @ Columbus Blue Jackets (2005–06) ||14–12–2 || 
|- align="center" bgcolor="#CCFFCC"
|29||W||December 10, 2005||3–2 SO|| align="left"|  Edmonton Oilers (2005–06) ||15–12–2 || 
|- align="center" bgcolor="#FFBBBB"
|30||L||December 13, 2005||3–4 || align="left"|  Minnesota Wild (2005–06) ||15–13–2 || 
|- align="center" bgcolor="#CCFFCC"
|31||W||December 17, 2005||5–4 || align="left"|  Colorado Avalanche (2005–06) ||16–13–2 || 
|- align="center" bgcolor="#FFBBBB"
|32||L||December 19, 2005||6–9 || align="left"| @ Toronto Maple Leafs (2005–06) ||16–14–2 || 
|- align="center" bgcolor="#CCFFCC"
|33||W||December 21, 2005||4–2 || align="left"|  New Jersey Devils (2005–06) ||17–14–2 || 
|- align="center" bgcolor="#FFBBBB"
|34||L||December 23, 2005||2–4 || align="left"|  Ottawa Senators (2005–06) ||17–15–2 || 
|- align="center" bgcolor="#FFBBBB"
|35||L||December 26, 2005||3–6 || align="left"| @ Buffalo Sabres (2005–06) ||17–16–2 || 
|- align="center" bgcolor="#FFBBBB"
|36||L||December 28, 2005||2–6 || align="left"|  New York Rangers (2005–06) ||17–17–2 || 
|- align="center" bgcolor="#FFBBBB"
|37||L||December 30, 2005||3–4 || align="left"| @ Ottawa Senators (2005–06) ||17–18–2 || 
|-

|- align="center" bgcolor="#FFBBBB"
|38||L||January 2, 2006||1–2 || align="left"|  Tampa Bay Lightning (2005–06) ||17–19–2 || 
|- align="center" bgcolor="#CCFFCC"
|39||W||January 4, 2006||4–3 OT|| align="left"|  Florida Panthers (2005–06) ||18–19–2 || 
|- align="center" bgcolor="#FFBBBB"
|40||L||January 6, 2006||1–4 || align="left"| @ Carolina Hurricanes (2005–06) ||18–20–2 || 
|- align="center" bgcolor="#FFBBBB"
|41||L||January 7, 2006||0–3 || align="left"|  Carolina Hurricanes (2005–06) ||18–21–2 || 
|- align="center" bgcolor="#FFBBBB"
|42||L||January 10, 2006||1–2 || align="left"| @ Nashville Predators (2005–06) ||18–22–2 || 
|- align="center" bgcolor="#CCFFCC"
|43||W||January 12, 2006||3–2 || align="left"|  Calgary Flames (2005–06) ||19–22–2 || 
|- align="center" bgcolor="#FFBBBB"
|44||L||January 14, 2006||1–8 || align="left"|  Vancouver Canucks (2005–06) ||19–23–2 || 
|- align="center" bgcolor="#CCFFCC"
|45||W||January 17, 2006||2–1 OT|| align="left"| @ Chicago Blackhawks (2005–06) ||20–23–2 || 
|- align="center" bgcolor="#FFBBBB"
|46||L||January 19, 2006||3–4 || align="left"| @ Carolina Hurricanes (2005–06) ||20–24–2 || 
|- align="center"
|47||L||January 21, 2006||2–3 SO|| align="left"| @ New Jersey Devils (2005–06) ||20–24–3 || 
|- align="center" bgcolor="#FFBBBB"
|48||L||January 24, 2006||0–4 || align="left"|  New Jersey Devils (2005–06) ||20–25–3 || 
|- align="center" bgcolor="#CCFFCC"
|49||W||January 26, 2006||4–3 SO|| align="left"|  Pittsburgh Penguins (2005–06) ||21–25–3 || 
|- align="center" bgcolor="#CCFFCC"
|50||W||January 28, 2006||4–3 || align="left"| @ Boston Bruins (2005–06) ||22–25–3 || 
|- align="center" bgcolor="#CCFFCC"
|51||W||January 31, 2006||5–3 || align="left"|  Washington Capitals (2005–06) ||23–25–3 || 
|-

|- align="center" bgcolor="#FFBBBB"
|52||L||February 2, 2006||2–5 || align="left"|  New York Rangers (2005–06) ||23–26–3 || 
|- align="center" bgcolor="#CCFFCC"
|53||W||February 4, 2006||5–4 SO|| align="left"| @ Pittsburgh Penguins (2005–06) ||24–26–3 || 
|- align="center"
|54||L||February 6, 2006||2–3 OT|| align="left"|  Tampa Bay Lightning (2005–06) ||24–26–4 || 
|- align="center" bgcolor="#FFBBBB"
|55||L||February 8, 2006||2–5 || align="left"| @ Philadelphia Flyers (2005–06) ||24–27–4 || 
|- align="center" bgcolor="#CCFFCC"
|56||W||February 11, 2006||2–1 || align="left"| @ New Jersey Devils (2005–06) ||25–27–4 || 
|- align="center" bgcolor="#FFBBBB"
|57||L||February 28, 2006||3–5 || align="left"|  Montreal Canadiens (2005–06) ||25–28–4 || 
|-

|- align="center" bgcolor="#CCFFCC"
|58||W||March 2, 2006||3–2 SO|| align="left"|  New Jersey Devils (2005–06) ||26–28–4 || 
|- align="center" bgcolor="#CCFFCC"
|59||W||March 4, 2006||4–2 || align="left"|  Philadelphia Flyers (2005–06) ||27–28–4 || 
|- align="center" bgcolor="#FFBBBB"
|60||L||March 6, 2006||2–5 || align="left"| @ Washington Capitals (2005–06) ||27–29–4 || 
|- align="center" bgcolor="#CCFFCC"
|61||W||March 7, 2006||2–1 SO|| align="left"|  New Jersey Devils (2005–06) ||28–29–4 || 
|- align="center" bgcolor="#CCFFCC"
|62||W||March 10, 2006||2–1 SO|| align="left"|  Toronto Maple Leafs (2005–06) ||29–29–4 || 
|- align="center" bgcolor="#CCFFCC"
|63||W||March 11, 2006||3–1 || align="left"| @ Boston Bruins (2005–06) ||30–29–4 || 
|- align="center" bgcolor="#CCFFCC"
|64||W||March 14, 2006||6–1 || align="left"| @ New Jersey Devils (2005–06) ||31–29–4 || 
|- align="center" bgcolor="#FFBBBB"
|65||L||March 16, 2006||2–4 || align="left"| @ Atlanta Thrashers (2005–06) ||31–30–4 || 
|- align="center" bgcolor="#FFBBBB"
|66||L||March 17, 2006||2–4 || align="left"| @ Florida Panthers (2005–06) ||31–31–4 || 
|- align="center" bgcolor="#FFBBBB"
|67||L||March 19, 2006||2–5 || align="left"| @ Tampa Bay Lightning (2005–06) ||31–32–4 || 
|- align="center" bgcolor="#CCFFCC"
|68||W||March 21, 2006||3–1 || align="left"|  Montreal Canadiens (2005–06) ||32–32–4 || 
|- align="center"
|69||L||March 24, 2006||3–4 OT|| align="left"| @ Pittsburgh Penguins (2005–06) ||32–32–5 || 
|- align="center" bgcolor="#CCFFCC"
|70||W||March 25, 2006||5–1 || align="left"|  Atlanta Thrashers (2005–06) ||33–32–5 || 
|- align="center" bgcolor="#FFBBBB"
|71||L||March 28, 2006||0–2 || align="left"| @ Montreal Canadiens (2005–06) ||33–33–5 || 
|- align="center" bgcolor="#FFBBBB"
|72||L||March 29, 2006||1–5 || align="left"|  New York Rangers (2005–06) ||33–34–5 || 
|- align="center" bgcolor="#FFBBBB"
|73||L||March 31, 2006||0–4 || align="left"|  Pittsburgh Penguins (2005–06) ||33–35–5 || 
|-

|- align="center" bgcolor="#FFBBBB"
|74||L||April 2, 2006||1–4 || align="left"|  Philadelphia Flyers (2005–06) ||33–36–5 || 
|- align="center" bgcolor="#FFBBBB"
|75||L||April 5, 2006||2–3 || align="left"| @ Toronto Maple Leafs (2005–06) ||33–37–5 || 
|- align="center" bgcolor="#FFBBBB"
|76||L||April 6, 2006||1–3 || align="left"| @ New York Rangers (2005–06) ||33–38–5 || 
|- align="center" bgcolor="#CCFFCC"
|77||W||April 8, 2006||5–0 || align="left"|  Washington Capitals (2005–06) ||34–38–5 || 
|- align="center" bgcolor="#CCFFCC"
|78||W||April 11, 2006||3–2 || align="left"| @ New York Rangers (2005–06) ||35–38–5 || 
|- align="center"
|79||L||April 13, 2006||3–4 OT|| align="left"|  Toronto Maple Leafs (2005–06) ||35–38–6 || 
|- align="center" bgcolor="#CCFFCC"
|80||W||April 15, 2006||5–4 SO|| align="left"|  Pittsburgh Penguins (2005–06) ||36–38–6 || 
|- align="center" bgcolor="#FFBBBB"
|81||L||April 17, 2006||1–6 || align="left"| @ Pittsburgh Penguins (2005–06) ||36–39–6 || 
|- align="center" bgcolor="#FFBBBB"
|82||L||April 18, 2006||1–4 || align="left"|  Philadelphia Flyers (2005–06) ||36–40–6 || 
|-

|-
| Legend:

Player statistics

Scoring
 Position abbreviations: C = Center; D = Defense; G = Goaltender; LW = Left Wing; RW = Right Wing
  = Joined team via a transaction (e.g., trade, waivers, signing) during the season. Stats reflect time with the Islanders only.
  = Left team via a transaction (e.g., trade, waivers, release) during the season. Stats reflect time with the Islanders only.

Goaltending

Awards and records

Awards

Transactions
The Islanders were involved in the following transactions from February 17, 2005, the day after the 2004–05 NHL season was officially cancelled, through June 19, 2006, the day of the deciding game of the 2006 Stanley Cup Finals.

Trades

Players acquired

Players lost

Signings

Draft picks
New York's draft picks at the 2005 NHL Entry Draft held at the Westin Hotel in Ottawa, Ontario.

See also
 2005–06 NHL season

Notes

References

New York Islanders seasons
New York Islanders
New York Islanders
New York Islanders
New York Islanders